The  is an AC electric multiple unit (EMU) train type operated on limited express services by Kyushu Railway Company (JR Kyushu) in Japan. The type is part of Hitachi's A-train family of multiple units.

Operations
The 885 series is operated on two of JR Kyushu's named trains:
 Kamome between Hakata and Nagasaki on the Kagoshima and Nagasaki Main Lines.  Kamome trains use the Kagoshima Main Line between Hakata and Tosu, and the Nagasaki Main Line from Tosu to Nagasaki, diverting via the Nagasaki tunnel. The Shiroi Kamome fleet entered service on 11 March 2000.
 Sonic between Hakata and Ōita using the Kagoshima and Nippō lines. The Sonic fleet entered service on 3 March 2001.

The fleet was originally divided into seven Shiroi Kamome (White Seagull) fleet sets, SM1 to SM7, with yellow lining, and four Shiroi Sonic (White Sonic) sets, SM8 to SM11, with blue lining, but the entire fleet was later made interchangeable, with all sets repainted with blue lining by June 2012.

After the opening of the Nishi Kyushu Shinkansen, the 885 series is to replace a part of the ageing 783 series train sets on the Midori service between Hakata and Sasebo. The higher speed of the 885 series in curves will allow for a 9 minute reduction in the overall travel time.

Formations
The Shiroi Kamome fleet was built and entered service as six-car units. The Sonic fleet entered service as five-car units, but were extended to six cars in 2003 to allow interchangeability between the two fleets.

Sets SM1–7
These sets are formed as follows:

 Cars 2 and 5 are each fitted with one PS401KA single-arm pantograph.
 Cars 4, 5, and 6 of Set SM3 are numbered in the -400 series.

Sets SM8–11
These sets are formed as follows.

 Cars 2 and 5 are each fitted with one PS401KA single-arm pantograph.

Interior
Seating is covered in leather. The interior flooring is made of wood.

History

All cars were made no-smoking from the start of the revised timetable on 18 March 2007.

By June 2012, all sets were repainted into the Sonic colour scheme of white with blue lining.

Exports
The 885 series has also been used as the basis for six 8-car trains for use on the route between Taipei and Hualien in Taiwan (known as Taroko Express). Deliveries of the trains began in late 2006, with the first public test of the new trains in March 2007.

References

Electric multiple units of Japan
Kyushu Railway Company
Train-related introductions in 2000
Hitachi multiple units
Tilting trains
20 kV AC multiple units